Jean Marion (1912–1967) was a French composer known for his work on film scores.

Selected filmography
 The Inevitable Monsieur Dubois (1943)
 Voyage Without Hope (1943)
Box of Dreams (1945)
Mademoiselle X (1945)
Lessons in Conduct (1946)
Fantômas (1946)
 The Bouquinquant Brothers (1947)
 Rendezvous in Paris (1947)
Impeccable Henri (1948)
 Millionaires for One Day (1949)
 The Cupid Club (1949)
The King (1949)
Beware of Blondes (1950)
My Wife Is Formidable (1951)
My Seal and Them (1951)
My Husband Is Marvelous (1952)
This Man Is Dangerous (1953)
 Quay of Blondes (1954)
 Cadet Rousselle (1954)
L'impossible Monsieur Pipelet (1955)
Thirteen at the Table (1955)
 Mannequins of Paris (1956)
OSS 117 Is Not Dead (1957)
 Anyone Can Kill Me (1957)
Taxi, Roulotte et Corrida (1958)
Le Bossu (1959)
Le Miracle des loups (1961)
The Big Restaurant (1966)
Oscar (1967)

References

External links

1912 births
1967 deaths
French composers
Musicians from Paris